Soleivi Hernandez (born September 12, 1980) is an amateur figure competitor recognized by the National Physique Committee (NPC).

Biography

Hernandez was born September 12, 1980, in Chalatenango, El Salvador, and was brought to Houston, Texas, at age 3. From 1998 to 2002 she attended the University of the Incarnate Word in San Antonio, Texas, where she played NCAA Division II softball in 2000 and 2003. She started weight training at age 22.

Hernandez began competing in 2006, with the goal of becoming a figure professional. She finished second in her first NPC show, the John Sherman Classic, and followed that up with an overall victory in the 2007 NPC New York Metropolitan. Afterward,  Hernandez focused on securing her professional card. Her third show was the NPC Team USA Figure Nationals in 2007, where she did not place high enough to receive it.

Contest history

2006 NPC John Sherman Classic - Figure Class A - 2nd
2007 NPC New York Metropolitan Figure Championship - Figure Class A - 1st - Overall Champion
2007 NPC Team USA Figure Nationals - Figure Class A - 16th

See also 

 List of female fitness & figure competitors

References 

1980 births
Living people
Fitness and figure competitors
University of the Incarnate Word alumni
Incarnate Word Cardinals softball players